Bentonville High School (BHS) is a public high school in Bentonville, Arkansas, United States. Founded in 1910, the school provides education for students in grades nine through twelve. It is one of two high schools of the Bentonville School District.

Communities zoned to Bentonville High include: much of north-east Bentonville, most of Cave Springs, much of Bella Vista, and small sections of Gravette, Little Flock, Rogers, and Springdale.

Alumni
 Doug McMillon, CEO of Walmart
 Malik Monk, NBA player

See also

 Old High Middle School (Bentonville, Arkansas), the old high school building, listed on the National Register of Historic Places

References

External links

 

1910 establishments in Arkansas
Educational institutions established in 1910
International Baccalaureate schools in Arkansas
Public high schools in Arkansas
Schools in Benton County, Arkansas
Buildings and structures in Bentonville, Arkansas